The Ghaggar-Hakra River is an intermittent river in India and Pakistan that flows only during the monsoon season. The river is known as Ghaggar before the Ottu barrage, and as Hakra downstream of the barrage in the Thar Desert. In pre-Harappan times the Ghaggar was a tributary of the Sutlej. It is still connected to this paleochannel of the Sutlej, and possibly the Yamuna, which ended in the Nara River, presently a delta channel of the Indus River joining the sea via Sir Creek.

The Sutlej changed its course about 8,000-10,000 years ago, leaving the Ghaggar-Hakra as a system of monsoon-fed rivers terminating in the Thar Desert. The Indus Valley Civilisation prospered when the monsoons that fed the rivers diminished around 5,000 years ago, and a large number of sites from the Mature Indus Valley Civilisation (2600-1900 BCE) are found along the middle course of the (dried-up) Hakra in Pakistan. Around 4,000 years ago, the Indus Valley Civilisation declined when the monsoons further diminished, and the Ghaggar-Hakra dried up, becoming a small seasonal river.

Nineteenth and early 20th century scholars, but also some more recent authors, have suggested that the Ghaggar-Hakra might be the defunct remains of the Sarasvati River mentioned in the Rig Veda, fed by Himalayan-fed rivers, despite the fact that the Ghaggar-Hakra had dried up by that time.

River course
The basin consists of two parts, Khadir and Bangar. Bangar are the higher banks that are not flooded in rainy season, while khadar refers to the lower flood-prone area.

Ghaggar River

The Ghaggar is an intermittent river in India, flowing during the monsoon rains.

Dammed at Ottu barrage near Sirsa, Ghaggar feeds two irrigation canals that extend into Rajasthan.

Tributaries of the Ghaggar

The main tributaries of the Ghaggar are the Kaushalya river, Markanda, Sarsuti, Tangri and Chautang.

The Kaushalya river is a tributary of Ghaggar river on the left side of Ghaggar-Hakra, it flows in the Panchkula district  of Haryana state of India and converges with Ghaggar river near Pinjore just downstream of Kaushalya Dam.

Hakra River
The Hakra is the dried-out channel of a river near Fort Abbas City in Pakistan that is the continuation of the Ghaggar River in India. The Hakra-channel is connected to paleochannels of the Sutlej and the Yamuna, which ended in the Nara River, a delta channel of the Indus River joining the sea via Sir Creek. The Sutlej changed its course about 8,000-10,000 years ago, leaving the Ghaggar-Hakra as a system of monsoon-fed rivers terminating in the Thar Desert.

This Sutlej/Yamuna paleochannel streamed through Sindh, and its sign can be found in Sindh areas such as Khairpur, Nawabshah, Sanghar and Tharparkar.

A large number of sites from the Mature Indus Valley Civilisation (2600-1900 BCE) are found along the middle course of the (dried-up) Hakra in Pakistan. IVC-sites have not been found further south than the middle of Bahawalpur district, and it has been assumed that the Hakra ended there in a series of terminal lakes.

Paleography
While there is general agreement that the river courses in the Indus Basin have frequently changed course, the exact sequence of these changes and their dating have been problematic.

Older publications have suggested that the Sutlej and the Yamuna drained into the Hakra well into Mature Harappan times, providing ample volume to the supply provided by the monsoon-fed Ghaggar. The Sutlej and Yamuna then changed course between 2500 BCE and 1900 BCE, due to either tectonic events or "slightly altered gradients on the extremely flat plains," resulting in the drying-up of the Hakra in the Thar Desert. More recent publications have shown that the Sutlej and the Yamuna shifted course well before Harappan times, leaving the monsoon-fed Ghaggar-Hakra which dried-up during late Harappan times.

Pre-Holocene
The paleo-channel of the Sutlej was active until the end of the Ice Age, some 10,000-8,000 years ago, emptying into the Rann of Kutch via the Nara river.

Clift et al. (2012), using dating of zircon sand grains, have shown that subsurface river channels near the Indus Valley Civilisation sites in Cholistan immediately below the dry Ghaggar-Hakra bed show sediment affinity with the Beas River in the western sites and the Sutlej and the Yamuna in the eastern ones, suggesting that the Yamuna itself, or a channel of the Yamuna, along with a channel of the Sutlej may have flowed west some time between 47,000 BCE and 10,000 BCE, well before the beginnings of Indus Civilization.

Analysis of sand grains using optically stimulated luminescence by Ajit Singh and others in 2017 indicated that the suggested paleochannel of the Ghaggar-Hakra is actually a former course of the Sutlej, which diverted to its present course before the development of the Harappan Civilisation. The abandonment of this older course by the Sutlej started 15,000 years ago, and was complete by 8,000 years ago. Ajit Singh et al. conclude that the urban populations settled not along a perennial river, but a monsoon-fed seasonal river that was not subject to devastating floods.

Khonde et al. (2017) confirm that the Great Rann of Kutch received sediments from a different source than the Indus, but this source stopped supplying sediments after ca. 10,000 years ago. Likewise, Dave et al. (2019) state that "[o]ur results disprove the proposed link between ancient settlements and large rivers from the Himalayas and indicate that the major palaeo-fluvial system traversing through this region ceased long before the establishment of the Harappan civilisation."

Indus Valley Civilisation

Mature IVC
During the IVC, the Ghaggar-Hakra fluvial system was not a large glacier-fed Himalayan river, but a monsoonal-fed river. The Indus Valley Civilisation prospered when the monsoons that fed the rivers diminished around 5,000 years ago, and a large number of sites from the Mature Indus Valley Civilisation (2600-1900 BCE) are found along the middle course of the (dried-up) Hakra in Pakistan. Around 4,000 the Indus Valley Civilisation declined when the monsoons further diminished, and the Ghaggar-Hakra dried-up, becoming a small seasonal river.

According to archaeologist Rita Wright, the large number of documented sites may be due to the ephemeral nature of the settlements, with the inhabitants frequently moving around in pursuit of water. According to archaeologist Shereen Ratnagar, many Ghaggar-Hakra sites in India are actually those of local cultures; some sites display contact with Harappan civilisation, but only a few are fully developed Harappan ones. Hetalben Sidhav notes that claims of a large number of Ghaggar-Hakra sites are politically motivated and exaggerated. While the Indus remained an active river, the Ghaggar-Hakra dried up, leaving many sites undisturbed, which explains why such a large number of sites has been found.

Drying-up of the Hakra and decline of the IVC
Late in the 2nd millennium BCE the Ghaggar-Hakra fluvial system dried up, becoming the small seasonal river it is today, which affected the Harappan civilisation. Paleobotanical information documents the aridity that developed after the drying up of the river. The diminishing of the monsoons particular effected the Ghaggar-Hakra system, which became ephemeral and was largely abandoned, with the IVC reorganizing in local settlements some 4000 years ago. In the late Harappan period the number of late Harappan sites in the middle Ghaggar-Hakra channel and in the Indus valley diminished, while it expanded in the upper Ghaggar-Sutlej channels and in Saurashtra. The IVC-people migrated east toward the more humid regions of the Indo-Gangetic Plain, where the decentralised late Harappan phase took place.

The same widespread aridification in the third millennium BCE also led to water shortages and ecological changes in the Eurasian steppes, leading to a change of vegetation, triggering "higher mobility and transition to nomadic cattle breeding," These migrations eventually resulted in the Indo-Aryan migrations into South Asia.

Most of the Harappan sites along the Ghaggar-Hakra are presently found in desert country, and have remained undisturbed since the end of the Indus Civilization. This contrasts with the heavy alluvium of the Indus and other large Panjab rivers that have obscured Harappan sites, including part of Mohenjo Daro. Painted Grey Ware sites ( 1000–600 BCE) have been found at former IVC-sites at the middle and upper Ghaggar-Hakra channel, and have also been found in the bed and not on the banks of the Ghaggar-Hakra river, which suggests that river was certainly dried up by this period. The sparse distribution of the Painted Gray Ware sites in the Ghaggar river valley indicates that during this period the Ghaggar river had already dried up.

Identification with the Rigvedic Sarasvati River

Since the 19th century, proposals have been made to identify the mythological Sarasvati River with the Ghaggar-Hakra River. The Sarasvati is often mentioned in the Rig Veda, which describes it as a mighty river located between the Indus and the Ganges, while later Vedic texts describe it as disappearing in the desert. Arguments have been made that the Ghaggar-Hakra was such a mighty river, due to tributaries which were supposed to receive snow melt waters from the Himalayas. Yet, more recent research shows that the Ghaggar-Hakra was monsoon-fed during Harappan times, and had already dried-up during Vedic times.

Rig Veda
The Sarasvati River is mentioned in all books of the Rigveda except the fourth. It is the only river with hymns entirely dedicated to it: RV 6.61, RV 7.95 and RV 7.96. It is mentioned as a divine and large river, which flows "from the mountains to the samudra," which some take as the Indian Ocean. The Rig Veda was composed during the latter part of the late Harappan period, and according to Shaffer, the reason for the predominance of the Sarasvati in the Rig Veda is the late Harappan (1900–1300 BCE) population shift eastwards to Haryana.

The identification with the Sarasvati River is based on the mentions in Vedic texts, e.g. in the enumeration of the rivers in Rigveda 10.75.05; the order is Ganga, Yamuna, Sarasvati, Sutudri, Parusni. Later Vedic texts record the river as disappearing at Vinasana (literally, "the disappearing") or Upamajjana, and in post-Vedic texts as joining both the Yamuna and Ganges as an invisible river at Prayaga (Allahabad). Some claim that the sanctity of the modern Ganges is directly related to its assumption of the holy, life-giving waters of the ancient Saraswati River. The Mahabharata says that the Sarasvati River dried up in a desert (at a place named Vinasana or Adarsana).

Identification
Nineteenth and early 20th century scholars, such as orientalist Christian Lassen (1800–1876), philologist and Indologist Max Müller (1823–1900), archaeologist Aurel Stein (1862–1943), and geologist R. D. Oldham (1858–1936), had considered that the Ghaggar-Hakra might be the defunct remains of a river, the Sarasvati, invoked in the orally transmitted collection of ancient Sanskrit hymns, the Rig Veda composed circa 1500 BCE to 1200 BCE.

More recently, but writing before Giosan's 2012 publication and supposing a late Harappan diversion of the Sutlej and the Yamuna, several scholars have identified the old Ghaggar-Hakra River with the Vedic Sarasvati River and the Chautang with the Drishadvati River. Gregory Possehl and Jane McIntosh refer to the Ghaggar-Hakra River as "Sarasvati" throughout their respective 2002 and 2008 books on the Indus Civilisation, and Gregory Possehl states "Linguistic, archaeological, and historical data show that the Sarasvati of the Vedas is the modern Ghaggar or Hakra."

Because most of the Indus Valley sites known so far are actually located on the Ghaggar-Hakra river and its tributaries and not on the Indus river, some Indian archaeologists, such as S.P. Gupta,  have proposed to use the term "Indus Sarasvati Civilization" to refer to the Harappan culture which is named, as is common in archaeology, after the first place where the culture was discovered.

Objections
Romila Thapar terms the identification "controversial" and dismisses it, noticing that the descriptions of Sarasvati flowing through the "high mountains" does not tally with Ghaggar's course and suggests that Sarasvati is Haraxvati of Afghanistan which is also known as the Helmand river. Wilke suggests that the identification is problematic since the Ghaggar-Hakra river was already dried up at the time of the composition of the Vedas, let alone the migration of the Vedic people into northern India.

The idea that the Ghaggar-Hakra was fed by Himalayan sources has also been contradicted by recent geophysical research, which shows that the Ghaggar-Hakra system, although having greater discharge in Harappan times which was enough to sustain human habitation, was not sourced by the glaciers and snows of the Himalayas, but rather by a system of perennial monsoon-fed rivers. In contrast to all Himalayan rivers in the region that dug out wide valleys in their own sediments as the monsoon declined, no such valley exists between the Sutlej and the Yamuna, demonstrating that neither the Ghaggar-Hakra nor any other Sarasvati candidate in that region had a Himalayan source.

Rajesh Kocchar further notes that, even if the Sutlej and the Yamuna had drained into the Ghaggar during Vedic period, it still would not fit the Rig Vedic descriptions because "the snow-fed Satluj and Yamuna would strengthen [only the] lower Ghaggar. [The] upper Ghaggar would still be as puny as it is today." According to Rajesh Kocchar there are two Sarasvati rivers mentioned in the Rigveda. The older one described in the family books of the Rigveda, which he calls Naditama Sarasvati, drains into a samudra. The newer one described in the tenth book of Rigveda as well as later Vedic texts, which he calls Vinasana Sarasvati, disappears in the sands. The Vinasana Sarasvati has been "accepted by all" to be the same as the Ghaggar-Hakra river. The description of the Naditama Sarasvati in the Rigveda matches the physical features of the Helmand River in Afghanistan, more precisely its tributary the Harut River, whose older name was Haraxvatī in Avestan. Ganga and Yamuna, he takes to be small streams in its vicinity. When the Vedic people moved east into Punjab, they named the new rivers they encountered after the old rivers they knew from Helmand.

See also 
 Sutlej
 Ganges
 Indus

Notes

References

Sources 
Printed sources

 
 

 

 
 

 
 

 

 
 
 
 

 

 
 
 

 

 
 
 
 
 
 

 

 
 

 
 
 
 
 
 

 

 

 
 

Web-sources

External links 

 OpenStreetMap: Ghaggar River, Hakra canal (partly on the Hakra bed).
 OpenStreetMap: Nara Canal
 Saraswati – the ancient river lost in the desert by A. V. Sankaran
 Map of the ancient Ghaggar and Hakra rivers, mapsofindia.com
 Sarasvati-Sindhu civilization and Sarasvati River
 The Saraswati: Where lies the mystery by Saraswati Paik

Rivers of Himachal Pradesh
Rivers of Rajasthan
Rivers of Punjab, India
Rivers of Haryana
Rivers of Sindh
Indus Valley civilisation
Rigvedic rivers
Indus basin
International rivers of Asia
Sarasvati River
Rivers of Pakistan
Rivers of India